Lesney Products & Co. Ltd. was a British manufacturing company responsible for the conception, manufacture, and distribution of die-cast toys under the "Matchbox" name. The company existed from 1947 until 1982.

History 
Lesney was founded on 19 January 1947 as an industrial die-casting company by Leslie Smith (6 March 1918 - 26 May 2005) and Rodney Smith (26 August 1917 - 20 July 2013). The name "Lesney" was an acronym from both partners' (which were not related by blood) names. They had been school friends and served together in the Royal Navy during World War II. Shortly after they founded the company, Rodney Smith introduced to his partner a man named John "Jack" Odell, an engineer he had met in a previous job at D.C.M.T. (another die-casting company). Mr. Odell initially rented a space in the Lesney building to make his own die-casting products, but he joined the company as a partner in that same year.

Lesney originally started operations in a derelict pub in north London (The Rifleman), but later, as finances allowed, changed location several times before finally moving to a factory in Hackney which became synonymous with the company. In late 1947 they received a request for parts for a toy gun.  As that proved to be a viable alternative to reducing their factory's output during periods in which they received fewer or smaller industrial orders, they started making die cast model toys the following year.  Seeing no future for the company, Rodney Smith left in 1951.

The first model toy they produced in 1948; a die-cast road roller based clearly on a Dinky model (the industry leader in die-cast toy cars at that time); in hindsight proves to be the first of perhaps three major milestones on the path to their eventual destiny. It established transportation as a viable and interesting theme; other similar models followed, including a cowboy-influenced covered wagon and a soap-box racer. The company continued to produce non-toy items; of those marketed directly by Lesney, one of the more popular ones was a Fishing bait press, well liked by British anglers at the time.

The next crucial milestone was the production of a replica of the Royal State Coach in 1953, the year of the coronation of Queen Elizabeth II. Two versions were created, the first in a larger scale, followed by a smaller-scale model. It was this second model that sold over a million units, a massive success at the time.  The profits from the sales provided valuable capital for further investments.

The final and decisive stepping stone in the pre-Matchbox era was a toy which Mr. Odell designed for his daughter Annie: a scaled-down version of the Lesney green and red road roller. The toy's origin is debatable; it's been said that the daughter's school only allowed children to bring toys that could fit inside a matchbox, but Nick Jones debunks this story in his book, Matchbox Toys. According to the book, Annie "kept bringing home spiders and creepy-crawlies inside a matchbox", so Odell promised to make her a toy that fit in the matchbox if she didn't bring any more spiders home. Odell then made her a scaled-down Road Roller, which became popular at her school. The idea was then born to sell the model in a replica matchbox – thus also yielding the name of the series which would propel Lesney to worldwide, mass-market success.  The road roller ultimately became the first of the Matchbox 1-75 miniature range; a dump truck, a cement mixer, and a Massey Harris Tractor (labelled 1a, 2a, 3a, and 4a respectively) completed the original four-model release.

In the early years of the series, Lesney used a partner company, "Moko" (itself also named after its founder, Moses Kohnstam), to market/distribute its toys. This distribution was documented on the boxes themselves, on which the text "A Moko Lesney product" appeared. By the end of the decade, Lesney was able to buy Moko, marketing its products under its own name from that point on. A period of great expansion, tremendous profit, and recognition followed: In 1966, Lesney received their first (of several) Queen's Awards for Industry. By the mid-'60s, Matchbox was the largest brand of die-cast model vehicles in the world, and had diversified the line into multiple series.

On 11 July 1982, after years of difficulties due to the economic climate in Britain at the time, Lesney went bankrupt and into receivership. Competing companies Mettoy (Corgi) and Meccano (Dinky) also suffered the same fate. The Matchbox brand as well as Lesney's tooling were bought by and became a division of Universal Holdings/Universal Toys, where the company re-formed as "Matchbox International Ltd."  Tooling and production were moved to Macau.  Jack Odell went on to form a new company, Lledo, where he produced models similar to early Matchbox Models of Yesteryear. Since 1996 the Matchbox brand has been owned by Mattel, creators of Hot Wheels.

Some of the tools and dies created in the Lesney era were still used in the Matchbox line of 2007.

Non-Matchbox Lesney toys 
Although the name Lesney became synonymous with Matchbox, the company produced several toys previous to and into the Matchbox era which were not sold under that famous moniker. Today, these are highly collectible items. They include:

 Road Roller (1947), later scaled down to become Matchbox no. 1 
 Cement Mixer (1948), later scaled down to become Matchbox no. 3 
 Caterpillar Crawler (1948), later scaled down to become Matchbox no. 8
 Caterpillar Bulldozer (1948), later scaled down to become Matchbox no. 18
 Milk Float (1949), later scaled down to become Matchbox no. 7; this was the 1st toy made in Lesney's second factory at Barratts Grove
 Soap-Box Racer (1949)
 Rag & Bone Cart (1949)
 Prime Mover & Trailer (1950), used in different scales later as Matchbox 1-75 and Major Pack models
 Jumbo the Elephant (1950), a clockwork toy (marketed by Moko)
 Muffin the Mule (1951), a puppet animal based on a TV show (marketed by Moko)
 large Royal State Coach (1951 & 1952); the 1st version included figures of king and queen; the horses were cast by competing company Benbros
 small Royal State Coach [Coronation Coach] (1953), first big seller, provided capital for further ventures
 Massey-Harris Tractor (1954), perhaps the finest Lesney toy, later scaled down to become Matchbox no. 4
 Conestoga Covered Wagon (1954)
Notes

See also 
 Matchbox (brand)

References

External links 
 Vintage British Diecast Forum - For all Matchbox related discussion
 Viintage British Diecast - Nick Jones Moko Lesney Matchbox Toy Collecting 1953-1983, detailed reference resource with photos
 BAMCA, the Bay Area Matchbox Collectors Association - a site with comprehensive listings of Lesney products, including detailed product information and photographs
  Photos of non-Matchbox Lesney toys as well as of Matchbox and competitors' models, and of the Lesney factory in Hackney
 History of Lesney and of Matchbox Models of Yesteryear
 www.70's-matchbox.de - Extensive matchbox collection of the 70's epoch
 Matchboxmemories - Great site on the 'Models of Yesteryear' range
 MOYBOYZ - forum chat board for collectors of the 'Models of Yesteryear' range
 MatchboxPeru.Com - Foro de autos a escala en español
 Matchbox Forum - an International Club of Matchbox Collectors exchanging Information mainly via the Internet

Toy companies of the United Kingdom
Toy cars and trucks
Toy companies established in 1947